Lobelia columnaris is a species of plant in the family Campanulaceae. It is the only giant Lobelia occurring in West Africa and is found in Cameroon and Equatorial Guinea. Its natural habitat is subtropical or tropical dry forests.

References

External links
 Lobelia columnaris in Brunken, U., Schmidt, M., Dressler, S., Janssen, T., Thombiano, A. & Zizka, G. 2008. West African plants - A Photo Guide. Forschungsinstitut Senckenberg, Frankfurt/Main.

columnaris
Near threatened plants
Taxonomy articles created by Polbot